Nhoabe privatalis is a species of snout moth in the genus Nhoabe. It was described by Viette in 1960, and is known from the Comoro Islands.

References

Moths described in 1960
Pyralinae
Moths of Madagascar
Moths of the Comoros